The Kansas City Mavericks are an ice hockey team in the ECHL. Founded in 2009 as the Missouri Mavericks of the CHL, the team plays in Independence, Missouri, a suburb of Kansas City, Missouri, at the Cable Dahmer Arena.

History

On April 16, 2009, the Central Hockey League announced an expansion team for Independence, to begin play in the 2009–10 season. The new organization teamed up with local newspaper The Examiner to hold a name-the-team contest until May 11.  The Missouri Mavericks' name, logo, and colors were unveiled on June 24.

On May 29, 2009, it was reported that Scott Hillman would be the Mavericks' first head coach, resigning from his same position with the Southern Professional Hockey League's Knoxville Ice Bears to do so.  In his time with the Ice Bears, Hillman led them to two consecutive SPHL President's Cup championships and Coffey Trophies (awarded for the most regular-season points). On November 13, 2009, the team played their home opener before a crowd of 5,760 people at the Independence Events Center.

On September 17, 2011, the Mavericks announced an affiliation agreement with the Chicago Wolves of the American Hockey League for the 2011–12 season.  This agreement would be renewed in one-year contracts until 2015.

On May 24, 2012, the Mavericks extended head coach Scott Hillman's contract for two additional years through the 2013–14 season. On July 31, 2012, the Mavericks announced an agreement with Entercom to have all 66 games for the 2012-13 season broadcast on the radio on 1660 KUDL.

On May 21, 2014, Hillman announced his resignation from the Mavericks and soon after was named as the first head coach for the expansion Indy Fuel of the ECHL. In June, the Mavericks hired Richard Matvichuk as the organization's new coach.

On October 7, 2014, shortly before the 2014–15 Central Hockey League season was set to begin, it was announced that the CHL had ceased operations and the Mavericks, along with the Allen Americans, Brampton Beast, Quad City Mallards, Rapid City Rush, Tulsa Oilers and Wichita Thunder, were all approved for expansion membership application into the ECHL for the 2014-15 season.

On February 5, 2015, Lamar Hunt Jr., son of Kansas City Chiefs' founder Lamar Hunt, bought a 100 percent ownership stake in the Missouri Mavericks.

On June 11, 2015, the Mavericks announced they had signed a two-year affiliation deal with the New York Islanders.  The Mavericks then served as the Islanders' secondary minor league affiliate, behind the Bridgeport Sound Tigers of the American Hockey League.

On June 2, 2016, head coach Richard Matvichuk resigned after leading the Mavericks for two seasons, a regular season championship, and named ECHL coach of the year in 2015–16. He left the organization to become the head coach of the Western Hockey League's Prince George Cougars. He was replaced by John-Scott Dickson, who had played for the team from 2011 to 2015 before joining the coaching staff as an assistant coach in 2015–16. Also, beginning with the 2016–17 season, the Mavericks and St. Louis Blues entered into a working agreement for cross-promoting hockey in Missouri and Kansas. However, the Islanders/Tigers organization still remained the Mavericks affiliate for player development.

On March 11, 2017, the Missouri Mavericks announced the team would be renamed the Kansas City Mavericks beginning in the 2017–18 season. Also prior to the 2017–18 season, their affiliation with the Islanders ended when that organization affiliated with the expansion Worcester Railers. On June 8, 2017, Kansas City affiliated with the Calgary Flames (NHL) and the Stockton Heat (AHL).

In his fourth season as head coach, Dickson was fired on January 30, 2020, while the team was in last place in their division. After the season ended, the Mavericks hired Florida Everblades' assistant Tad O'Had as the head coach.

On July 28, 2022, the Mavericks announced a new affiliation with the Seattle Kraken and Seattle's AHL affiliate, the Coachella Valley Firebirds.

Season-by-season records

Players and personnel

Current roster
As of January 27, 2023.

Team captains 

 Tyler Fleck, 2009
 Carlyle Lewis, 2009–11
 Sebastien Thinel, 2011–2015
 Trevor Ludwig, 2015–16
 Andrew Courtney, 2016–17
 Tyler Elbrecht, 2017–18
 Rocco Carzo, 2018–2020
 Rob Bordson, 2020–21
 Lane Scheidl, 2021–22
 Nick Pastujov, 2022–

Notable alumni 
 Kyle Burroughs
 Ville Husso
 Ross Johnston
 Maxime Lagacé
 Jed Ortmeyer
 Carter Verhaeghe

References

External links

Official Website
Kansas City Mavericks Page on Eurohockey.com
Missouri Mavericks Page on EliteProspects.com
Missouri Mavericks Page on HockeyDB.com

 
Independence, Missouri
ECHL teams
Central Hockey League teams
Calgary Flames minor league affiliates
New York Islanders minor league affiliates
Seattle Kraken minor league affiliates
Professional ice hockey teams in Missouri
Sports in the Kansas City metropolitan area
Ice hockey clubs established in 2009
2009 establishments in Missouri
Sports teams in the Kansas City metropolitan area